Apantesis bicolor is a moth of the family Erebidae. It was described by George Hampson in 1904. It is found on the Bahamas.

References

Moths described in 1904
Arctiina
Moths of the Caribbean